Arpin Group, Inc. is a holding company headquartered in West Warwick, Rhode Island. They provide corporate, government, military and private (C.O.D.) moving services, as well as specialized transportation services.

Companies

Arpin Group is made up of multiple disparate subsidiaries, including Arpin Van Lines (formerly), Arpin International Group, Arpin Broadcasting Network, Arpin Renewable Energy, Intermodal Credit Corp, and Creative Storage Solutions. They also have major subsidiaries in Canada, Germany, Singapore, and Ireland.

Arpin International Group and Arpin Van Lines merged in 2007, creating a new subsidiary called Arpin Military Operations Center. It is used to provide monitoring services to military customers' shipments and claim settlements.

In March 2020, The Wheaton Group acquired Arpin Van Lines.

References

External links
"Preston, Utopia officials meet with state DOT representatives" - The Day

Moving companies of the United States
Companies based in Rhode Island
American companies established in 1900
Holding companies established in 1900
Transport companies established in 1900
1900 establishments in Rhode Island